The 2015–16 Western Carolina Catamounts men's basketball team represented Western Carolina University during the 2015–16 NCAA Division I men's basketball season. The Catamounts, led by 11th year head coach Larry Hunter, played their home games at the Ramsey Center and were members of the Southern Conference. They finished the season 16–18, 10–8 in SoCon play to finish in a tie for fifth place. They defeated Wofford to advance to the semifinals of the SoCon tournament where they lost to Chattanooga. They were invited to the College Basketball Invitational where they lost in the first round to Vermont.

Roster

Schedule

|-
!colspan=9 style="background:#592c87; color:#c0a878;"|  Regular season

|-
!colspan=9 style="background:#592c87; color:#c0a878;"| SoCon tournament

|-
!colspan=9 style="background:#592c87; color:#c0a878;"| CBI

References

Western Carolina Catamounts men's basketball seasons
Western Carolina
Western Carolina
West
West